Rong Desheng (榮德生; 4 August 1875 – 29 July 1952), born Rong Zongquan, was a prominent Chinese industrialist from Wuxi. He and his older brother Rong Zongjing established the Rong Family Corporation in Shanghai, which became the largest domestic company in the industries of cotton textile and flour in the Republic of China (1912–49). After Rong Zongjing's 1938 death during the Second Sino-Japanese War, Rong Desheng took over the business empire and adamantly refused to sell his company to the Japanese despite immense financial pressure and death threats.

After the Second Sino-Japanese War, Rong Desheng was kidnapped twice by gangsters backed by corrupt Kuomintang government officials who tried to extort money from him. When the Kuomintang was defeated in the 1949 Chinese Communist Revolution, Rong Desheng decided to remain in mainland China and cooperate with the Communist Party of China. He was one of few capitalists well-treated by the communists. His son Rong Yiren would become a Vice President of the People's Republic of China in the 1990s. Another son,  Rong Yixin or Paul Yung was a Senior Vice President of China National Aviation Corporation when he died in plane crash on Basalt Island in Hong Kong in 1948.

Biography 
He was born in Wuxi, Jiangsu province on August 4, 1875 (the fourth day of July in the first year of The Reign of Emperor Guangxu of the Qing Dynasty).

In 1884, he went to school.

In 1890, he entered Shanghai Tongshun Bank.

In 1893, he went with his father to Guangdong when the Lijin Bureau sanshui need to help account.

In 1897, he returned to Wuxi and worked as the manager of Wuxi Branch of Guangsheng Bank.

In October of the lunar calendar in 1899, he was invited to be the general accountant of The Bureau of Supplementary Taxation in Guangdong Province.

In 1901, he co-founded Baoxing Flour mill in Wuxi with his elder brother Rong Zongjing and others. A year later, he became manager of Maoxin flour Mill.

In 1905, he and his elder brother Zong Jing and other 7 people set up Zhenxin cotton mill in Wuxi and successively served as the manager and general manager.

In 1912, he set up Fuxin flour mill in Shanghai with his elder brother Zong Jing and others and served as impartial director.

In 1913, he was elected as a representative of the National Conference of Industry and Commerce, and put forward three bills including expanding the textile industry. In the western suburbs of Wuxi, he bought land to build plum garden, built the original road and rebuilt the Miao Minaret in nanzen Temple.

From April 1915, he and his elder brother Zong Jing successively established Shenxin Textile Factory No.1 to No.9 in Shanghai, Wuxi and Hankou, and served as the manager of Wuxi Shenxin No.3 factory.

By 1931, he and his elder brother Zong Jing owned 12 flour mills and 9 cotton mills. Together with zong Jing, his elder brother Zong Jing was known as "King of flour" and "King of cotton yarn", and they became one of the industrialists with the largest capital in China. During this period, he was elected as a member of the second Parliament of Jiangsu Province and a member of the Beiyang Government.

Since 1938, he has been in charge of Rong's enterprise, and has built 6 new factories in Chongqing, Chengdu, Baoji, Guangzhou and other places to support the Anti-Japanese War.

In November 1945, Tianyuan Industrial Company was established in Wuxi, and Tianyuan flax textile Factory, Open source Machine Factory and Jiangnan University were founded.

In September 1949, he was elected a member of the first National Committee of the Chinese People's Political Consultative Conference. He was elected as a member of the Preparatory Committee of All-China Federation of Industry and Commerce and a member of the Consultative Committee of the People's Congresses of all walks of life in South Jiangsu.

He died of illness in Wuxi, Jiangsu province on July 29, 1952.

Personal anecdote

Prefer death to surrender. 
Rong Desheng's way of establishing oneself and running a family is Confucius' Confucian saying that "to establish oneself means to establish others, and to achieve success means to achieve success". Mr. Wing Tak Sang said, "The words and deeds of ancient sages are nothing more than the virtues of the University, and the sincerity, integrity and moral cultivation in the Doctrine of the Mean will lead to the governance of the country and the peace of the world. It is also true that sages must first be sincere, seek truth from facts and achieve common success." He believed that in order to increase productivity, in addition to adding new equipment and improving operating techniques, we should start from "human", strengthen personnel management, and regard human as the first element of productivity. He said, "If I run a factory and hire people who are not experts, if I am sincere, if I am not strict with them, if I am virtuous, if I care about my family and my children, and if I do not worry about my work, then my autonomy is effective. Confidence can teach the scope of the factory imitation. He adhered to the ideological principle of "persuading people by virtue", and it really worked. "This is good for the maoxin factories, good for the Fuxin factories and bad for the Shenxin factories." (the mining farming custom XingNian chronicle) this application with people, good for repaid management thinking to arouse the enthusiasm of people, coordination between managers and by managers and by managers within the relationship, form a power concentrated group of producers, and general with simple improvement methods to improve the practice of labor productivity, is can't match.

In the winter of 1937, The Japanese invaders occupied Shanghai, and Jiangnan territory was successively occupied. Rong's enterprises were either bombed or occupied by the Japanese, and only the factories in the concession maintained production. In May of the following year, Rong Desheng came to Shanghai from Hankou and stayed at home. He only searched and bought ancient books, calligraphy and paintings by himself, hoping for a better situation. In 1941, Japanese businessmen coveted Rongshi yarn factory, by wang pseudo real ministry sent staff and Rong Desheng to discuss, he will be shen New one, eight factories and Japan's Toyota yarn factory, was immediately rejected sternly. Wang puppet foreign Minister Chu Minyi had to come to Shanghai in person, fake international hotel invited Rong Desheng for an interview. Rongdesheng by his son Erren in the past, that his father did not change the original intention, not to sell the factory and personality. Chu Minyi brazenly said, "Half the country in China is owned by the Japanese. Why bother with the two small Shenxin factories?" And threatened: "Don't drink without punishment!" Rongdesheng hears a speech, awestruck say: "I would rather die than die."

Book collection 
Rong Desheng set up various schools and built roads and Bridges. In 1916, he established Dagong Library in Wuxi Huishan and bought more than 90,000 volumes of various books. He kept the library by himself and invited Yan Xiaolan, a scholar in the late Qing Dynasty, to compile the collection catalogue. In 1921, it was published as the collection Catalogue of Wuxi Private Grand Duke Library in 12 volumes, divided into five volumes, namely, Classics, history, sub-volume, collection and series. The collection of books is mostly composed of more than 110,000 volumes of writings and local materials by wuxi sages, reaching 180,000 volumes before the Anti-Japanese War. There are also many rare books such as Yuan Engravings and Ming engravings, such as Ni Zan, complete Works of The Secret Cabinet of Qing Dynasty, Records of Wuxi County, and Public works of Fan Wenzheng, etc., all of which are rare. In his old age, there was also a library building in Shanghai called "Le Nong Jing She". When he died, he left a will and donated all the books with more than 50,000 volumes to Wuxi Library. Wuxi Library printed a catalogue of Mr. Rong Desheng's books. Thousands of other cultural relics were donated to the Shanghai Museum.

References

1875 births
1952 deaths
Businesspeople from Wuxi